Philip Davis Guggenheim (born November 3, 1963) is an American writer, director and producer. His credits include NYPD Blue, ER, 24, Alias, The Shield, Deadwood, and the documentaries An Inconvenient Truth, It Might Get Loud, The Road We've Traveled, Waiting for "Superman", Inside Bill's Brain: Decoding Bill Gates, and He Named Me Malala. Since 2006, Guggenheim is the only filmmaker to release three different documentaries that were ranked within the top 100 highest-grossing documentaries of all time (An Inconvenient Truth, It Might Get Loud, and Waiting for "Superman").

Early life
Philip Davis Guggenheim was born in St. Louis, Missouri, the son of Marion Davis (née Streett) and filmmaker Charles Guggenheim. His father was Jewish, whereas his mother was Episcopalian. He graduated from the Potomac School, Sidwell Friends School and Brown University.

Career
Guggenheim joined the HBO Western drama Deadwood as a producer and director for the first season in 2004. The series was created by David Milch and focused on a growing town in the American West. Guggenheim directed the episodes "Deep Water", "Reconnoitering the Rim", "Plague" and "Sold Under Sin". He left the crew at the end of Season 1.

The documentary, An Inconvenient Truth, was produced and directed by Davis Guggenheim. An Inconvenient Truth won the Academy Award in 2007 for Best Documentary Feature. The film, released in 2006, featured Former U.S. Vice President Al Gore and his international slideshow on global warming.

Then-candidate Barack Obama's biographical film, which aired during the Democratic National Convention in August 2008, was directed by Guggenheim. Their infomercial, which was broadcast two months later,  on October 29, 2008, was "executed with high standards of cinematography", according to The New York Times. In 2012, he released The Road We've Traveled, a 17-minute short film on the president.

Guggenheim directed and was an executive producer of the 2009 pilot for Melrose Place. His brother-in-law, Andrew Shue, starred on the 1990s version of the series.

In 2008, he released It Might Get Loud, a documentary that glimpses into the lives of guitarists Jimmy Page, The Edge, and Jack White.

Guggenheim's 2010 documentary Waiting for "Superman", a film about the failures of American public education sparked controversy and debate. Guggenheim knew his film would lead to this and said, "I know people will say this movie is anti-this or pro-that. But it really is all about families trying to find great schools". This film received the Audience Award for best documentary at the 2010 Sundance Film Festival. Its public release was in September 2010.

A documentary film about the band U2 directed by Guggenheim titled From the Sky Down opened the 2011 Toronto International Film Festival in September.

In 2013, he directed a 30-minute documentary The Dream is Now about four undocumented students in the United States as they deal with the U.S. immigration system.

In 2015, he directed a documentary film He Named Me Malala about a young Pakistani female activist Malala Yousafzai, who was targeted by Taliban gunmen, shot in the head and left wounded.

In 2019, he created and directed a documentary miniseries titled Inside Bill's Brain: Decoding Bill Gates. The series explores the mind and motivations behind the captain of industry and philanthropist Bill Gates, the rise of Microsoft, and the past and current pursuits of the Bill & Melinda Gates Foundation.

In 2020, Guggenheim and Jonathan King launched production company Concordia Studio.

Personal life 
Guggenheim married actress Elisabeth Shue in 1994. They have three children together.

References

External links

Teach
Biography
Interview
The Director's Take: Davis Guggenheim captures the ideals of the "former next president" interview,  Riverfront Times, June 7, 2006
"Waiting for Superman" to Save Our Public Schools: An in-depth interview with Director Davis Guggenheim

1963 births
Directors of Best Documentary Feature Academy Award winners
American documentary filmmakers
American film directors
Film producers from Missouri
American people of German-Jewish descent
American television directors
American television producers
Brown University alumni
Members of the Creative Commons board of directors
Living people
Businesspeople from St. Louis